Vexillum roseotinctum is a species of small sea snail, marine gastropod mollusk in the family Costellariidae, the ribbed miters.

Description
The length of the shell attains 8 mm.

Distribution
This marine species opccurs of Lifou Island, Loyalty Islands.

References

External links
  Hervier, J. "Descriptions d'especes nouvelles de mollusques, provenant de l'Archipel de la Nouvelle-Caledonie (suite)." Journ. de Conchyl. 46 (1897): 3a.

roseotinctum
Gastropods described in 1897